The Central District of Piranshahr County is in West Azerbaijan province, Iran. At the National Census in 2006, its population was 84,920 in 16,657 households. The following census in 2011 counted 99,205 people in 23,063 households. At the latest census in 2016, the district had 115,200 inhabitants in 28,893 households.

References 

Piranshahr County

Districts of West Azerbaijan Province

Populated places in West Azerbaijan Province

Populated places in Piranshahr County